This is a list of singles that reached number one on the Swiss Hitparade from the years 2000 to 2009 by week each reached the top of the chart.

Number-one singles

See also
2000s in music

References

Number-one singles
Switzerland
2000s